Wycoller is a village in the civil parish of Trawden Forest in Pendle, Lancashire, England.

The village may date back to the 10th century BC. Central to the village are the ruins of 16th-century Wycoller Hall. The village is a conservation area, and is closed to outside traffic. There is a car park on Trawden Road and another on the east side of the village opposite Height Laithe Farm on the road towards Haworth in Yorkshire.

The name is probably from the Old English wīc "dairy farm" and alr "alder", so means "dairy farm by the alders".

Bridges

Various ancient bridges cross Wycoller Beck, including 'Pack-Horse Bridge', a twin arched bridge in the centre of the village, 'Clapper Bridge' (also known as Hall Bridge) and 'Clam Bridge' (also known as Bank House Bridge). The last is believed to be of neolithic origin (possibly 6000 years old) and is listed as an ancient monument. It consists of just a long stone laid across the river. It was damaged by floods in 1989–90, though has now been repaired. All three bridges are designated as both Grade II* listed buildings and scheduled monuments.

Wycoller Hall

Wycoller Hall was originally the home of the Hartley family, and passed through marriage to the Cunliffe family in the early 17th century. The hall was built in 1550 by Piers Hartley, and was extended in the late 18th century by its last owner, Squire Cunliffe. The structure was dismantled in 1818, and reused in the construction of a cotton mill, to help repay debts owed by Henry Owen-Cunliffe, who was the last Cunliffe to live at the hall. He was born Henry Owen of Sheffield and was left the Hall by a distant uncle (Cunliffe) if he changed his name to Cunliffe and educated himself. The hall subsequently fell into ruin and is reputed to be haunted by a variety of spectres. Like the bridges, it is both a Grade II* listed building and a scheduled monument.

'Ferndean Manor' in Charlotte Brontë's novel Jane Eyre is thought to be based on Wycoller Hall. The Brontë Way passes through here, leading to the Brontë sisters' home in nearby Haworth.

20th–21st centuries
Wycoller was featured in the BBC's Countryfile programme when they visited the barn in the village that has been converted to a tourist information centre.
Wycoller also appears in The Railway Children a 1970 British drama film based on the novel of the same name by E. Nesbit. 

Wycoller was also featured in Episode 2 of the television series Penelope Keith's Hidden Villages in 2014.

Notable people from the village include Tom Emmott, who founded the Lancastrian Party while living in Wycoller Cottage.

See also

Listed buildings in Trawden Forest
Scheduled monuments in Lancashire

References

External links

 Pendle Net Wycoller Webpages
 Abandoned communities ... Wycoller
 "Friends" Website
 [http://www.wycollercraftcentre.co.uk/"Wycoller Tearoom/History website

Towns and villages in the Borough of Pendle